The 2013 Austin 400 was a motor race meeting for the Australasian sedan-based V8 Supercars. It was the fifth event of the 2013 International V8 Supercars Championship. Four races were held during the race meeting. It was the first V8 Supercar event to be held in North America.

Jamie Whincup, driving for Triple Eight Race Engineering, dominated the event, continuing his strong form from the previous round at Barbagallo Raceway. Whincup won three of the four races and scored three pole positions. Brad Jones Racing's Fabian Coulthard was the only driver to beat Whincup, taking one pole position and one race win.

The event took place on a short version of the Circuit of the Americas, 2.3 mi (3.7 km) long instead of 3.426 mi (5.513 km).

Championship standings after the race
 After 16 of 36 races.

Drivers' Championship standings

Teams' Championship standings

 Note: Only the top five positions are included for both sets of standings.

References

Austin 400
Austin 400
Austin 400